Tufanovo is a rural locality (a station) in Komyanskoye Rural Settlement, Gryazovetsky District, Vologda Oblast, Russia. The population was 49 as of 2002.

Geography 
Tufanovo is located 27 km north of Gryazovets (the district's administrative centre) by road. Maloye Denisyevo is the nearest rural locality.

References 

Rural localities in Gryazovetsky District